Crystal is an unincorporated community in Columbia Township, Dubois County, in the U.S. state of Indiana.

History
Crystal was not platted. A post office was established at Crystal in 1889, and remained in operation until it was discontinued in 1919.

Geography

References

Unincorporated communities in Dubois County, Indiana
Unincorporated communities in Indiana
Jasper, Indiana micropolitan area
1889 establishments in Indiana
Populated places established in 1889